North Reformed Church is a historic church at 510 Broad Street in Newark, Essex County, New Jersey, United States.

The congregation was founded in 1856 and the church building was constructed in 1857. Its spire reaches 

The building was added to the National Register of Historic Places in 1972.

See also 
 National Register of Historic Places listings in Essex County, New Jersey

References

External links
Historical Information

Churches in Newark, New Jersey
Churches on the National Register of Historic Places in New Jersey
Reformed Church in America churches in New Jersey
National Register of Historic Places in Newark, New Jersey
New Jersey Register of Historic Places